Shalimar or Shalamar refers to three historic royal gardens (or Baghs) of the Mughal Empire in South Asia:
 Shalimar Bagh, Srinagar, Jammu and Kashmir, India; built in 1619
 Shalimar Gardens, Lahore, Pakistan; a UNESCO World Heritage Site built in 1641
 Shalimar Bagh, Delhi, India; built in 1653

Shalimar may also refer to:

South Asia 
 Shalimar Garden, Ghaziabad, an area in Ghaziabad
 Shalimar, Lahore, one of the constituent towns of Lahore, Pakistan
 Shalamar Institute of Health Sciences
 Shalamar Hospital
 Shalamar Medical and Dental College
 Shalimar railway station, serving Howrah and Kolkata
 Shalimar Express, train between Delhi and Jammu Tawi, India
 Shalimar Express (Pakistan), train between Karachi and Lahore

Other places 
 Shalimar, alternative name of Shadmehr, a small city in Razavi Khorasan Province, Iran
 Shalimar, Florida, a town in the United States

Music 
 Shalamar, a soul-R&B group
 "Kashmiri Song" (1902), also known by its first line "Pale hands I loved beside the Shalimar"
 A river in "The Hippopotamus Song" by Flanders and Swann

Film and literature 
 Shalimar (1946 film), a 1946 Bollywood film
 Shalimar (1978 film), a 1978 Hindi film
 Shalimar, a book by Manohar Malgonkar
 Shalimar the Clown, a 2005 novel by Salman Rushdie
 Shalimar Fox, a character in Mutant X (TV series)
 A town in Song of Solomon (novel), a 1977 novel by Toni Morrison

Other uses 
 , a Royal Navy ship
 Shalimar (perfume), the flagship fragrance of perfume house Guerlain
 Frank Coutts Hendry, used the pseudonym Shalimar